Carcinoembryonic antigen-related cell adhesion molecule 3 (CEACAM3) also known as CD66d (Cluster of Differentiation 66d), is a member of the carcinoembryonic antigen (CEA) gene family..

This gene encodes a member of the family of carcinoembryonic antigen-related cell adhesion molecules (CEACAMs), which are used by several bacterial pathogens to bind and invade host cells. The encoded transmembrane protein directs phagocytosis of several bacterial species that is dependent on the small GTPase Rac. It is thought to serve an important role in controlling human-specific pathogens by the innate immune system. Alternatively spliced transcript variants have been described, but their biological validity has not been determined.

Use
CEACAM3 is expressed exclusively on granulocytes and used as granulocyte marker.

See also
 Cluster of differentiation

References

Further reading

External links
 
 

Clusters of differentiation